Bruce Alexander may refer to:

Bruce K. Alexander (born 1939), Canadian psychologist known for research into addiction
Bruce Alexander (actor) (born 1946), English actor
Bruce Alexander (American football) (born 1965), American football player
Bruce Alexander Cook (1932–2003), American journalist and author who also wrote under the pseudonym Bruce Alexander

See also
Alexander Bruce (disambiguation)